James Michael Schnitker is a former professional American football player who played offensive lineman for the Denver Broncos.

References

1946 births
American football offensive guards
Denver Broncos (AFL) players
Denver Broncos players
Colorado Buffaloes football players
Living people
People from Atchison County, Missouri
Players of American football from Missouri